The Central District (Meḥoz haMerkaz) of Israel is one of six administrative districts, including most of the Sharon region. It is further divided into 4 sub-districts: Petah Tikva, Ramla, Sharon, and Rehovot. The district's largest city is Rishon LeZion. The district's population as of 2017 was 2,115,800. According to the Israeli Central Bureau of Statistics, 88% of the population is Jewish, 8.2% is Arab, and 4% are “non-classified”, being mostly former Soviet Union immigrants of partial or nominal Jewish ethnic heritage or household members of Jews.

Administrative local authorities

Former municipalities

Economy
El Al Airlines maintains its corporate headquarters on the grounds of Ben Gurion Airport and in the Central District.

See also

Districts of Israel
List of cities in Israel

References